The 2018–19 Melbourne Stars Women's season was the fourth in the team's history. Coached by David Hemp and captained by Kristen Beams, they finished seventh in the regular season of WBBL04 and failed to qualify for the finals.

Squad 

Each 2018–19 squad featured 15 active players, with an allowance of up to five marquee signings including a maximum of three from overseas. Under a new rule, Australian marquees were classed as players who held a national women's team contract at the time of signing on for their WBBL|04 team.

Personnel changes included:

 Holly Ferling joined the Stars, having spent three seasons with the Brisbane Heat where she was the first-ever player signing.
 After winning two championships as a member of the Sydney Sixers, Angela Reakes made a move interstate to sign with Melbourne.
 Nicola Hancock joined the Stars, having played previous seasons with the Hobart Hurricanes and the Melbourne Renegades.
 Hayleigh Brennan departed the team and subsequently signed with the Perth Scorchers.
 In August 2018, Emma Kearney confirmed her decision to quit cricket and instead focus on her AFL Women's career.
 In September 2018, Gemma Triscari announced her retirement from the WBBL.
 New Zealand player Katey Martin replaced England marquee Georgia Elwiss, who was unable late in the season due to national team commitments, for two matches.

The table below lists the Stars players and their key stats (including runs scored, batting strike rate, wickets taken, economy rate, catches and stumpings) for the season.

Ladder

Fixtures 

All times are local time

The Melbourne Renegades recorded the second one-wicket victory in the league's history when Lea Tahuhu, a fast bowler not known for her batting ability, hit the winning single off leg-spinning Stars captain Kristen Beams with just one ball to spare. Courtney Webb, on 21 not out, was the set batter at the non-striker's end.

Statistics and awards 

 Most runs: Lizelle Lee – 276 (equal 19th in the league)
 Highest score in an innings: Lizelle Lee – 102* (56) vs Sydney Sixers, 1 December 2018
 Most wickets: Alana King – 15 (equal 10th in the league)
 Best bowling figures in an innings: Nicola Hancock – 4/22 (4 overs) vs Sydney Sixers, 1 December 2018
 Most catches (fielder): Alana King – 8 (equal 5th in the league)
 Player of the Match awards: 
 Erin Osborne – 2
 Alana King, Lizelle Lee, Katie Mack – 1 each
 Stars Player of the Season: Alana King

References 

2018–19 Women's Big Bash League season by team
Melbourne Stars (WBBL)